The Natural History of Aleppo is a 1756 book by naturalist Alexander Russell on the natural history of Aleppo. In 1794 his half-brother, Patrick Russell, revised and expanded the text in a second edition. The book is significant for its quality, the contemporary interest it attracted, and for being a product of the Scottish Enlightenment.

When the book was published it was immediately an important European record and perspective on the state of contemporary science in Syria.

The book contains the earliest known description of the Syrian hamster.

References

External links
The Natural History of Aleppo at Internet Archive
2008 sale of book by Christie's

Natural history books
Scottish Enlightenment
History of Aleppo
1756 books